The Warren County Board of County Commissioners is a body of three people, called commissioners, that govern Warren County, New Jersey.

Structure 
The board is responsible for the governance of Warren County, New Jersey. They set out the budget for the county as well as the laws in the county. Each year the members choose two people on the board to serve as director and deputy director. The current director is Commissioner Jason Sarnoski, and Commissioner Richard Gardner is serving as deputy director.

Party affiliation

Sessions 
In 2018, Commissioner Edward Smith announced his retirement and James Kern was nominated to his seat. Kern won the election and was sworn in on January 1.

Previous Sessions

References

Warren County, New Jersey
County government in New Jersey